David Bush may refer to:

 David Bush (diver) (born 1951), American Olympic diver
 David F. Bush, member of the California legislature
 Dave Bush (born 1979), American baseball pitcher